Beautiful Mind is the fourth studio album by American rapper and singer Rod Wave. It was released through Alamo Records on August 12, 2022, and features guest appearances from Jack Harlow and December Joy. The album was supported by four singles: "By Your Side", "Cold December", "Stone Rolling", and "Alone". The album debuted at number one on the US Billboard 200 with 115,000 album-equivalent units, becoming Rod Wave's second consecutive number-one album and fourth Top-10 album.

Critical reception

Dylan Green of Pitchfork gave the album a 6.9 out of 10, complimenting the variety of topics covered in the songs but complaining of many of them "bleeding together" as well as the "overreliance of piano and guitar beats".

Track listing

Sample credits
 "Alone" contains samples from "U.N.I.", written by Ed Sheeran and Jake Gosling, and performed by the former.
 "No Deal" contains samples from "People Watching", written by Conan Gray and Daniel Nigel, and Julia Michaels, and performed by Gray.

Charts

Weekly charts

Year-end charts

Certifications

References

2022 albums
Rod Wave albums